Eddie Russo (November 19, 1925 – October 14, 2012) was an American racecar driver.

Russo won the midget car racing track championship Raceway Park in Chicago in 1950. Russo competed in the AAA and USAC Championship Car series in the 1952-1957 and 1960 seasons, with 21 career starts, including 3 times in the Indianapolis 500.  He finished in the top ten 5 times, with his best finish in 1955 at Langhorne.

His father, Joe, and his uncle, Paul, also entered the Indianapolis 500.

Indy 500 results

* shared drive with Ed Elisian

World Championship career summary
The Indianapolis 500 was part of the FIA World Championship from 1950 through 1960. Drivers competing at Indy during those years were credited with World Championship points and participation. Eddie Russo participated in 4 World Championship races but scored no World Championship points.

References

1925 births
2012 deaths
Indianapolis 500 drivers
Racing drivers from Chicago
AAA Championship Car drivers